Ogguere is a music group founded in 1988. The two members of the group chose Ogguere, a Yoruba word that means "soul of the earth", as a symbolic name. Their song "Cha Cuba" was recorded in 2001.

History
Edrey and Ulises first met in the Santos Suárez neighbourhood of Havana, where Edrey lived (and still lives) with his grandmother on Avenida Serrano. Ulises grew up in El Cotorro, the site of the old Modelo Brewery.

In 1996 Edrey and Ulises started working with Pablo Herrera, Cuba's premier rap producer, who also happened to live in Santos Suarez, on Calle Zapote. Deciding to disregard the lucrative reggaeton niche, Edrey and Ulises' idea was to use all the Cuban rhythms and create a fusion of Mambo, Son, Chachacha and mix them with funkier sounds, like the rumba.

"Cha Cuba" was recorded in 2001 with Orquesta Aragón, a traditional famous charanga band.

Ogguere was fast on the way to success and recognition when they recorded the track "Como Esta El Yogourt" (How's the yogourt?), which video clip was directed by prominent Cuban artist Alexandre Arrechea.

They recorded their first album, Llena de Amor El Mambo, which features contributions from legendary Cuban musicians such as Chucho Valdés and Pablo Milanés.

Discography 
Llena de Amor El Mambo

References 
 Video interview of Ogguere on Havana-Cultura

External links 
 https://www.youtube.com/watch?v=c7x2tLHvQQE
 https://www.youtube.com/watch?v=2-FNepYAgno
 http://www.thehmagazine.com/cuban_music/ogguere.htm
 https://www.youtube.com/watch?v=2-FNepYAgno

Cuban hip hop groups
Reggaeton groups